Leucozona  is a genus of hoverflies. Species within this genus typically have a variegated pattern of dull and bright colours on the thorax and abdominal segments such as white or even blue (Leucozona glaucia). This colouration allows the hoverfly to mimic more predaceous bees and wasps, for example Leucozona lucorum.

Species
Leucozona glaucia (Linnaeus, 1758)
Leucozona inopinata (Doczkal, 2000)
Leucozona laternaria (Müller, 1776)
Leucozona lucorum (Linnaeus, 1758)
Leucozona velutina (Williston, 1882)
Leucozona xylotoides (Johnson, 1916)
Leucozona americana  (Curran, 1923)
Leucozona kingdonwardi  (Ghorpade, 1994)
Leucozona ussuriensis  (Stackelberg, 1929)

Gallery

References

Diptera of Europe
Diptera of North America
Hoverfly genera
Taxa named by Ignaz Rudolph Schiner
Syrphini